Cadillac station is a Montreal Metro station in the borough of Mercier–Hochelaga-Maisonneuve in Montreal, Quebec, Canada. It is operated by the Société de transport de Montréal (STM) and serves the Green Line. It is in the district of Mercier-Ouest. The station opened on June 6, 1976, as part of the extension of the Green Line to Honoré-Beaugrand station.

Overview 
Designed by Longpré, Marchand, Goudreau, Dobush, Stewart, et Bourke, it is a normal side platform station built in tunnel. The central mezzanine gives access to the entrances diagonally across from one another at the corner of rue de Cadillac and rue Sherbrooke. The hallways to these entrances feature complementary murals by Jean Cartier.

Origin of the name
This station is named for rue de Cadillac, itself named after Antoine Laumet, dit de La Mothe sieur de Cadillac (1658–1730) — a colourful French explorer of New France who founded Detroit, Michigan and commanded it from 1701 to 1710. Despite his name being pronounced as \ka.di.jak\ in French, the station is pronounced as \ka.di.lak\.

Connecting bus routes

Nearby points of interest
 Sanctuaire Marie-Reine-des-Coeurs
 Centre hospitalier Grace-Dart

References

External links

 Cadillac Station - official site
 Montreal by Metro, metrodemontreal.com - photos, information, and trivia
 2011 STM System Map
 Metro Map

Green Line (Montreal Metro)
Brutalist architecture in Canada
Mercier–Hochelaga-Maisonneuve
Railway stations in Canada opened in 1976